Canadian federal elections have provided the following results in Prince Edward Island.

Regional Profile
From 1988 to 2006, Prince Edward Island did not elect a non-Liberal MP. In 2008, the Conservatives finally broke through in the province, as Gail Shea was elected in Egmont. Lawrence MacAulay won by less than 300 votes in both 1997 and 2000, but won with a commanding majority in 2004. In 2011 PEI had an unusual result in which the Conservatives had the most votes province-wide, but won only one out of the four provincial seats. This was due to a comfortable margin of victory in Egmont, and closer losses in the other three ridings. In 2015, the Liberals easily swept all 4 seats. They repeated the sweep in 2019, but with smaller margins due to a large rise in Green support.

Votes by party throughout time

2015 - 42nd General Election

2011 - 41st General Election

2008 - 40th General Election
Three Liberal incumbents were re-elected.  This was the first victory for the Conservatives in Prince Edward Island since 1984.

2006 - 39th General Election
All four Liberal incumbents were re-elected.  This was the sixth consecutive sweep of Prince Edward Island for the federal Liberals.

2004 - 38th General Election

2000 - 37th General Election

Elections in Prince Edward Island
Canadian federal election results
Election results